Jennifer Stanley (born 1970) is an American mystery novelist. She also writes under the name Ellery Adams.

Personal life 
Stanley is from Long Island, New York.

She received a bachelor's degree from Franklin and Marshall College. She has a master of arts from West Chester University and an master of library and information science from North Carolina Central University. Stanley began her writing career when she moved from Durham, North Carolina to Richmond, Virginia. Her pen name was inspired by one of her favorite authors, Ellery Queen.

The Secret, Book & Scone Society was a New York Times bestseller.

Stanley is married and has two children.

Selected works

As Ellery Adams

The Secret, Book & Scone Society 

 The Secret, Book & Scone Society (Kensington, 2017) 
 The Whispered Word (Kensington, 2018)
 The Book of Candlelight (Kensington, 2020)

The Book Retreat Mysteries 

 Murder in the Mystery Suite (Berkley, 2014) 
 Murder in the Paperback Parlor (Berkley, 2015) 
 Murder in the Secret Garden (Berkley, 2016) 
 Murder in the Locked Library (Kensington, 2018) 
 Murder in the Reading Room (Kensington, 2019) 
 Murder in the Storybook Cottage (Kensington, 2020)

Charmed Pie Shoppe Mysteries 

 Pies and Prejudice (Berkley, 2012) 
 Peach Pies and Alibis (Berkley, 2013) 
 Pecan Pies and Homicides (Berkley, 2014) 
 Lemon Pies and Little White Lies (Berkley, 2015) 
 Breach of Crust (Berkley, 2016)

As Jennifer Stanley 

 Stirring Up Strife (Minotaur, 2009)

As J.B. Stanley 

 Stiffs & Swine (Midnight Ink/Llellyn, 2008) 
 Chili Con Corpses (Midnight Ink/Llewellyn, 2008) 
 The Battered Body (Midnight Ink/Llewellyn, 2009) 
 Black Beans & Vice (Midnight Ink/Llewellyn, 2010)

References

External links 
Official website

1970 births
Living people
Franklin & Marshall College alumni
People from Long Island
American mystery novelists
West Chester University alumni
North Carolina Central University alumni
21st-century pseudonymous writers
Pseudonymous women writers